HC Berounští Medvědi is an ice hockey team in Beroun, Czech Republic. It plays in the 4th tier.

History
The club finished its almost 20-year-long run in the 1st Czech League in the 2013–14 season. Beroun was relegated to the Czech 2. liga at the end of that season. In 2014–2020, the team was inactive per orders from the Czech National Ice Hockey Federation, who have barred Beroun from entering the 2014-15 installment of the Czech 2. liga due to debt. From the 2020–21 season, the club plays in the 4th tier.

Achievements
Czech 2.liga champion: 1993.
Czech 1.liga runner up: 2004.

External links
 Official site

Ice hockey teams in the Czech Republic
Ice hockey clubs established in 1933
HC